Special Collections Research Center may refer to:
Special Collections Research Center (Earl Gregg Swem Library), Earl Gregg Swem Library, College of William & Mary
Special Collections Research Center, Gelman Library, George Washington University
Special Collections Research Center, D. H. Hill Library, North Carolina State University
Special Collections Research Center, Ernest S. Bird Library, Syracuse University
Special Collections Research Center, Regenstein Library, University of Chicago